is an Apollo asteroid and near-Earth object discovered on 6 October 2013 by the Catalina Sky Survey, during which it was near a close approach of 5.4 Lunar distances (LD) from the Earth. The asteroid only has a 10-day observation arc which makes long-term predictions of its position less certain. It was observed for three days as it approached Earth in the night sky starting with the sixth of October, 2013. Then it became unobservable by being between the Earth and the Sun, then not recovered due to its small size and dimness. Precovery images by Pan-STARRS from 29 September 2013 were announced on 11 February 2016 that extended the observation arc to 10 days. It was removed from the Sentry Risk Table on 11 February 2016, so there is no risk of impact from this object for the next hundred years or more. The asteroid was last observed on 9 October 2013.

2016 approach 
The asteroid has a poorly constrained orbit, has not been observed since 2013, and often makes approaches to Earth. One such approach occurred sometime from 6 to 10 March 2016 with an uncertainty in the time of closest approach of ±2 days. There was no risk of an Earth impact in 2016. JPL's graphic representation of 's orbit showed it was approaching Earth from the sunward side for an approach near the eighth of March with a chance of being detected by telescopes as it flew by. It was not expected to be more than 100 degrees from the Sun until March 9 and was expected to have an apparent magnitude of roughly 20.3. The asteroid was not recovered during the 2016 approach. During the March 2016 passage the uncertainty region for the asteroid covered as much as a 45 degree region of the sky.

Possible impacts
 was listed on the Sentry Risk Table. The asteroid is 21–52 meters (69–171 ft) across, making it approximately twice as large as the Chelyabinsk meteor. However, it is not listed as a potentially hazardous asteroid because it is less than 100 meters (330 ft) in diameter. With an insignificant 1-day observation arc, it was listed on the Sentry Risk Table with a 1 in 20 million chance it could impact Earth on 5 March 2016, but that threat was quickly ruled out. With a short 3-day observation arc, it was listed on the Sentry Risk Table with a 1 in 300 million chance it could impact Earth on 28 September 2017. The nominal (best-fit) solution shows that  should be around 1.5 AU from Earth on 28 September 2017. It was removed from the Sentry Risk Table on 11 February 2016 when precovery images gave it a 10-day observation arc.

If it were ever to impact Earth, it would likely create a large fireball in the sky and possibly an impact crater 100–575 meters (328–1,886 ft) across, assuming an impact angle of less than 45 degrees.

See also 
2009 RR
List of asteroid close approaches to Earth in 2016

Notes

References

External links 
 
 
 

Minor planet object articles (unnumbered)

20160305
20131006